Cyclophora benjamini is a moth in the  family Geometridae. It is found in south-eastern North America, including Florida, Georgia and Mississippi.

The wingspan is about 21 mm.

References

Moths described in 1936
benjamini
Moths of North America